Jesper Nielsen (born 30 September 1989) is a Swedish handball player for Aalborg Håndbold and the Swedish national team.

References

External links

1989 births
Living people
Swedish male handball players
Sportspeople from Norrköping
Expatriate handball players
Swedish expatriate sportspeople in France
Swedish expatriate sportspeople in Germany
Handball-Bundesliga players
Füchse Berlin Reinickendorf HBC players
IK Sävehof players
Rhein-Neckar Löwen players
Aalborg Håndbold players
21st-century Swedish people